William Routledge (1770–1843) was a Scottish Episcopalian priest.

Life

He was born at Calder Bridge around 1770 the son of William Routledge and his wife, Mary Hudspith.

Routledge was ordained in 1794. He was a Curate at St Andrew's Qualified Chapel from 1795 until 1805; and then the incumbent at St Andrew, Glasgow. He was also the inaugural Dean of  Glasgow and Galloway until his death.

He died at home 15 Cambridge Street in Glasgow on 21 August 1843.

Family

He married Jane Gibson daughter of Henry Gibson.

Artistic Recognition

He was portrayed by John D. Gibson.

References

Scottish Episcopalian priests
Deans of Glasgow and Galloway
1843 deaths